The Mad Bomberg is a 1957 West Germany comedy film directed by Rolf Thiele and starring Hans Albers, Marion Michael and Harald Juhnke. It was shot at the Göttingen Studios with sets designed by the art directors Gabriel Pellon and Peter Röhrig. The film is an adaptation of the 1923 novel of the same title by Josef Winckler which was based on a real historical Westphalian aristocrat of the nineteenth century. The film was conceived partly as an attempt to replicate the success of Albers' hit film Münchhausen (1943).

Plot

Cast
 Hans Albers as Baron Gisbert von Bomberg
 Marion Michael as Paula Mühlberg
 Harald Juhnke as Dr. Roland
 Paul Henckels as Dr. Emil Landois
 Ingeborg Christiansen as Emma, the buxom maid
 Gert Fröbe as Gustav-Eberhard Mühlberg
 Camilla Spira as Frau Kommerzienrat Mühlberg
 Ilse Künkele as Baroneß Adelheid von Twackel
 Erich Fiedler as Baron von Twackel
 Hubert von Meyerinck as Pastor
 Wanda Rotha as Editha
 Walter M. Wülf as Fuchs, the majordomo
 Herbert Hübner as Regiment Commander von Strullbach
 Otto Stoeckel as Kuno von Schnappwitz
  as Mathilde von Schnappwitz
 Herbert Weissbach as Count Murveldt
 Hans Leibelt as Professor von Wetzelstien
 Margit Symo as Galina Krakowskaja
 Helga Warnecke as Aunt Laura

References

Bibliography 
 Hake, Sabine. Popular Cinema of the Third Reich. University of Texas Press, 2001.

External links 
 

1957 films
1950s historical comedy films
German historical comedy films
West German films
1950s German-language films
Films directed by Rolf Thiele
Films based on German novels
Films set in the 19th century
1957 comedy films
1950s German films
Films shot at Göttingen Studios